The 10th Signal Regiment is a current regiment of the Royal Corps of Signals within the British Army.

History 
The regiment can trace its history back to the Lanarkshire Engineer Volunteers formed in 1859. In 1908 the regiment was named as the Scottish Command Signals (Army Troops), Territorial Force, part of Scottish Command.  Later after World War II the regiment became Headquarters British Army of the Rhine Signal Regiment.  And was later re-named and re-organized to the 10th Army Group Signal Regiment.  

As part of the Delivering Security in a Changing World changes the regiment was re-raised as a support signals regiment headquartered in Corsham.  The regiment's main role was a "National Communications Regular Signal Regiment".  The regiment was tasked with providing national communication signal duties.  As stated on the website, "the Regiment provides day-to-day command and control ICS to Land Command throughout mainland GB, ICS reaction forces for major national incidents, including Homeland Security and specialist ICS support to expeditionary operations".  

The regiment remained part of the 2nd Signal Brigade till 2012 when the Brigade became 2nd Signal Group.  As part of Army 2020 the regiment won't change role, except for the fact of joining the 11th Signal Brigade.  After the Army 2020 changes the regiment provides specialist capabilities across defense.  This includes electronic counter-measures and communications support and resilience to civil authority operations.

Current Organisation 
The current organisation of the regiment is (with roles):

 Regimental Headquarters, at Basil Hill Barracks, Corsham
 605 (Network Operations) Signal Troop, at Marlborough Lines, Andover
81 Signal Squadron (Army Reserve)
225 Signal Squadron, at Thiepval Barracks, Lisburn
 241 Signal Squadron, at Saint George's Barracks, Bicester Garrison
 251 Signal Squadron, at Duchess of Kent Barracks, Aldershot Garrison

See also 
 List of units of the British Army Territorial Force 1908 (Lanarkshire Engineers)
 Royal Corps of Signals
 2nd Signal Brigade (United Kingdom)

References

External links 
10 Signal Regiment

Regiments of the Royal Corps of Signals